Padma Kumari Aryal is a Nepali communist politician, a former member of the House of Representatives, former cabinet minister for Land Management, Cooperatives and Poverty Alleviation and current Minister of Agriculture and Livestock Development. She was also previously the Minister of State for Health and Population.

CPN UML career
As of 2017, she was the central committee member of CPN UML and district chairperson of Syangja district for the party.

2017 legislative election
In the federal legislative election of 2017, she was the CPN UML candidate for Syangja-2 constituency under the first-past-the-post system. She won the election, defeating her nearest rival Gopal Man Shrestha of Nepali Congress by more than 3,500 votes. She received 35,142 votes while Shrestha received 31,436. She was one of only eight women to be elected to parliament by a direct vote of the people in the 2017 election.

Personal life
Aryal has four brothers and three sisters. Her mother died in October 2018.

References

Living people
Place of birth missing (living people)
21st-century Nepalese women politicians
21st-century Nepalese politicians
People from Syangja District
Nepal Communist Party (NCP) politicians
Communist Party of Nepal (Unified Marxist–Leninist) politicians
Nepal MPs 2017–2022
Khas people
Members of the 1st Nepalese Constituent Assembly
1969 births